The Journal of Pediatric Psychology is a peer-reviewed academic journal covering child psychology. It was established in 1976 and is published 10 times per year by Oxford University Press on behalf of the Society of Pediatric Psychology, division 54 of the American Psychological Association, of which it is the scientific publication. The editor-in-chief is Tonya M. Palermo (University of Washington). According to the Journal Citation Reports, the journal has a 2020 impact factor of 3.191.

References

External links

Developmental psychology journals
American Psychological Association academic journals
Publications established in 1976
Oxford University Press academic journals
English-language journals
10 times per year journals